The Australian Guild of Screen Composers (AGSC) is a not for profit organisation, which was established in 1981, "to represent the interests of Australian screen composers by developing and promoting employment opportunities, undertaking educational initiatives and increasing their profile amongst the industry." It was established by Bruce Smeaton and Bruce Rowland. The Guild's head offices are in Sydney, with successive presidents from 1987 being Bob Young (1987–91), Martin Armiger (1992–98), Chris Neal (1999–2000), Art Phillips (2001–08), Clive Harrison (2008–11), Guy Gross (2012–17), Caitlin Yeo (2018–20) and Antony Partos (2020–present). Since 1991 it has been sponsored by the Australasian Performing Right Association (APRA).

AGSC presented film and television composers with awards from 1996 to 2000. Each year they released a compilation album, starting with The Australian Guild of Screen Composers 1996 Award Winners in 1997, via Sony Music Australia.

Since 2002 the AGSC, in collaboration with APRA and the affiliated Australasian Mechanical Copyright Owners Society (AMCOS), present Screen Music Awards at an annual ceremony as part of the APRA Music Awards. These honour, "compositions for documentaries, short films, mini-series, children's television and feature film scores" and other screen music scores.

AGSC Awards 1996–2000

Notes

References 

 
Music organisations based in Australia
Music industry associations